Colm Tucker (22 September 1952 – 11 January 2012) was an  international rugby union player. He toured South Africa in 1980 with the British Lions during a period when at club level he was representing Shannon RFC. Tucker was educated at St. Munchin's College in Limerick.

Colm Tucker had the ‘misfortune’ to have his surname misprinted in the programme for the international against France in Paris in 1980.

Tucker's death was announced in January 2012. He was 59.

Notes

1952 births
2012 deaths
Irish rugby union players
Ireland international rugby union players
Shannon RFC players
Munster Rugby players
British & Irish Lions rugby union players from Ireland
Rugby union flankers
People educated at St Munchin's College
Rugby union players from Limerick (city)